Augustino Paulo Sulle (born 13 October 1997) is a Tanzanian long-distance runner. In 2019, he competed in the men's marathon at the 2019 World Athletics Championships held in Doha, Qatar. He did not finish his race.

References

External links 
 

Living people
1997 births
Place of birth missing (living people)
Tanzanian male long-distance runners
Tanzanian male marathon runners
World Athletics Championships athletes for Tanzania